Woodcrest may refer to:

Places in the United States
Woodcrest, California, a census designated place near Riverside, California
Woodcrest, Indiana, an unincorporated community
Woodcrest (Nissequogue, New York), a national historic district located at Nissequogue in Suffolk County, New York
Woodcrest, New Jersey, an unincorporated area and neighborhood in Cherry Hill, New Jersey
Woodcrest Station, a PATCO Speedline station located above
Woodcrest (Radnor Township, Delaware County, Pennsylvania), a NRHP-listed mansion on the campus of Cabrini College

Other uses
Woodcrest (microprocessor), code name for a server and workstation variant of the Intel Core microarchitecture processor
Woodcrest, a fictional suburb in the comic strip The Boondocks